Daniel Lam Wai-keung SBS, JP is the former Chairman of the Hong Kong Regional Council (see ) as well as a former member of the Legislative Council of Hong Kong.

He is currently vice-chairman of the Heung Yee Kuk, an organisation representing indigenous inhabitants of the New Territories of Hong Kong, and was formerly chairman of Islands District Council. He was a member of Regional Council since 1991 and until the Council's abolishment in 1999, and of Islands District Council between 1981 and 2011.

References

External links
Heung Yee Kuk

1949 births
District councillors of Islands District
Members of the Regional Council of Hong Kong
Heung Yee Kuk
Hong Kong businesspeople
Indigenous inhabitants of the New Territories in Hong Kong
Living people
HK LegCo Members 1988–1991
HK LegCo Members 2004–2008
Members of the Selection Committee of Hong Kong
Members of the Election Committee of Hong Kong, 1998–2000
Members of the Election Committee of Hong Kong, 2000–2005
Members of the Election Committee of Hong Kong, 2012–2017
Members of the Election Committee of Hong Kong, 2017–2021
Members of the Election Committee of Hong Kong, 2021–2026
Recipients of the Silver Bauhinia Star